Ue or Straight U (Ү ү; italics: Ү ү) is a letter of the Cyrillic script.  It is a form of the Cyrillic letter U (У у У у) with a vertical, rather than diagonal, center line. Whereas a standard Cyrillic U resembles a lowercase Latin y, Ue instead uses the shape of a capital Latin Y, with each letter set higher or lower to establish its case. The lower case resembles the lower case of the Greek letter Gamma.

Ue is used the alphabets of the Bashkir, Buryat, Kalmyk, Kazakh, Kyrgyz, Mongolian, Turkmen, Tatar and other languages.

In Tuvan and Kyrgyz the Cyrillic letter can be written as a double vowel.

Computing codes

See also
Ü ü : Latin letter U with diaeresis - an Azerbaijani, Chinese, Estonian, German, Hungarian, Turkish and Turkmen letter
Ư ư : Latin letter U with horn, used in Vietnamese alphabet
Y y : Latin letter Y
Ӱ ӱ : Cyrillic letter U with diaeresis
Ӳ ӳ : Cyrillic letter U with double acute
Ұ ұ : Cyrillic letter straight U with stroke (Kazakh mid U)
Γ γ : Greek letter Gamma
Cyrillic characters in Unicode

References

Vowel letters
Tatar language